Death of an Angel is a 1986 religious drama film written and directed by Petru Popescu. It stars Bonnie Bedelia as the main character. The film was released on March 7, 1986, in limited release.

Cast
 Bonnie Bedelia as Grace McKenzie, a priest.
 Alex Colon as Robles
 Abel Franco as Don Tarjetas
 Irma García as Rosalba
 Pamela Ludwig as Vera, Grace's daughter.
 Leonard Lewis as Demecio
 Nick Mancuso as Father Angel

Production
The film is co-produced by Sundance Institute. Principal photography for the film takes place in El Paso, Texas, US.

Reception
The film received average reviews from critics. It grossed $18,000 in the United States.

See also
 List of Christian films

References

External links
 

1986 films
1980s English-language films